The Toros de Tijuana (or Tijuana Bulls) are a Mexican Baseball team based in Tijuana, Baja California, Mexico. They are members of the Mexican Baseball League and play their home games at Estadio Chevron.

Team history

Original Attempt 
The franchise was originally the Tecolotes de los Dos Laredos before moving to Tijuana to become the Toros de Tijuana in 2004. In their debut season they qualified for the postseason where they faced and defeated the Sultanes de Monterrey. In the second round of playoffs they were defeated by the Pericos de Puebla in five games. 

The Mexican League reportedly stripped the Toros owner of the franchise and gave it to new owners, who renamed that team the Potros de Tijuana after the original Tijuana team that played in Mexican Pacific League from 1977-1991. The Toros ownership kept the team name, logo, uniforms, and history as a result of the alleged political wrangling that went on in that league. The original ownership group in Mexico was slated to bring the team to the independent Golden Baseball League in 2005, but could not come to a stadium deal in Tijuana. A ballpark was said to be ready in Chula Vista, California, near San Diego, should the team have decided to come to the league. Had they joined the league, they would've not only been the league's first team based outside of the United States (that honor instead went to the travelling Japan Samurai Bears), but they would have also been the only privately owned team at the time.

The Potros clinched a playoff berth in 2005. They eliminated the Acereros de Monclova in 5 games in the first round of the playoffs. In the second round they would face the Diablos Rojas del Mexico to beat them in 6 games to go on to their first zone final, where they would face the Saraperos de Saltillo who won the championship in 7 games. In 2006 they would be eliminated in the first by the Sultanes de Monterrey. The 2008 season would be the last in the LMB, they would finish with a 41-61 record to finish sixth place in the North Division. The team would move to the city of Reynosa to become the Broncos de Reynosa.

Second Attempt 
The Toros de Tijuana rejoined the LMB in 2014 by acquiring the Petroleros de Minatitlán franchise. This season they would finish in sixth place in the North Division with a record of 55-58. In the 2015 season they would finish in fourth place, and the Toros had to play an elimination game against the Vaqueros Laguna for a Wild Card spot. The game was held at the home where the Toros prevailed 10-3. In the first round of the playoffs they would defeat Diablos Rojos del México in 7 games. In their second division final they would fall to the Acereros de Monclova in 7 games.

In 2016 they classified again for the postseason by finishing in third place in the North Zone, in the first round of playoffs they eliminated the Acereros de Monclova in 4 games to reach the North Final for the second consecutive year where they eliminated in 7 games the Sultanes de Monterrey, in order to reach his first Serie del Rey in the history of the team where he faced the Pericos de Puebla with whom they lost in 6 games.

LMB Champions and Onward 
In the 2017 season the Toros, led by Pedro Meré, finished in firstplace in the North Division. In the first round of the playoffs they defeated the Rieleros de Aguascalientes in 6 games to advance to the North Division Final where they defeated the Sultanes de Monterrey on the road. The Toros would proceed to defeat the Pericos de Puebla in Serie del Rey 4 games over 1 in order to win their first title in the Mexican Baseball League and raise the Zaachila Cup. The Most Valuable Player trophy went to Roberto López, who in the Serie del Rey had six RBIs, batted .429 in five games and was effective defensively in left field.

In the Spring 2018 season, they qualified for the postseason by finishing in Second Place, they eliminated the Rieleros de Aguascalientes in 4 games to go to the North Division Final, however they were eliminated by the Sultans of Monterrey. In the Fall 2018 season they finished in second place again but were eliminated again by the Sultanes de Monterrey in 7 games of the first round of playoffs. For 2019 they finished in first place in the North Division. In the first round of playoffs they defeated the Saraperos de Saltillo to advance to the North Division Final where they fell to the Acereros de Monclova.

The Toros won their most recent league title and second in team history on September, 15th 2021. They defeated the Leones de Yucatán in seven games. It marked the second time in league history that a team came back from being down three games to zero in the Serie del Rey.

Roster

See also
 Potros de Tijuana (Mexican League team)
 Tijuana Cimarrones (Golden Baseball League team)

References

External links
  

Baseball teams in Tijuana
Baseball teams established in 2004
Mexican League teams
2004 establishments in Mexico